Caliris elegans is a mantis species in the genus Caliris found in  Malaysia, Sumatra and Borneo.

References

External links 

Tarachodidae
Insects described in 1915
Insects of Malaysia
Taxa named by Ermanno Giglio-Tos